Avgaroz Bandaisdze was a Georgian calligrapher and painter of the 14th century. He was in service of Dukes of Ksani. His most important work is "History of the Eristavs". He had a son, Grigol who was a calligrapher as well.

References

Calligraphers from Georgia (country)
Painters from Georgia (country)
14th-century people from Georgia (country)
Year of birth missing
Year of death missing